This is a list of area codes in the U.S. state of Florida. As of 2022, Florida is serviced with twenty telephone area codes, having reserved two additional codes in planning stages.

When the first nationwide telephone numbering plan was introduced in 1947, the entire state was a single numbering plan area with area code 305. In 1953, area code 813 was introduced for the western coast of Florida, and 904 was assigned for northern Florida in 1965. In 1988, area code 407 was introduced for the Orlando area. In 1995, area code 954 was introduced for Broward County. In 1996, area code 239 was introduced for southwest Florida and area code 352 for the areas around Gainesville and Ocala. Many new area codes were introduced in the first two decades of the 21st Century, as a result of city expansion and growth of telecommunication services.

The existing and future area codes are:
 239: Southwest coast: all of Lee County, Collier County, mainland Monroe County excluding Florida Keys; includes Cape Coral, Fort Myers, Naples, Everglades City
 305: Overlay with 786 for Miami-Dade County and the Florida Keys
 321: Partial overlay with 407 and 689 for Orlando, Cocoa Beach, St. Cloud and central eastern Florida.  Also: Exclusive code for Space Coast: Cape Canaveral, Melbourne, Titusville, Cocoa Beach
 324: Overlay with 904 for Jacksonville, St. Augustine, Starke, Green Cove Springs and northeastern Florida
 352: Dunnellon, Gainesville, Inverness, Lady Lake, Ocala, Spring Hill, The Villages, Wildwood and central Florida
 386: Daytona Beach, Lake City, Live Oak, Crescent City and northern and eastern Florida
 407: Overlay with 689 and most of 321 for Orlando, Cocoa Beach, Kissimmee, St. Cloud and central eastern Florida
 448: Overlay with 850 for Pensacola, Tallahassee, Panama City and the Florida panhandle 
 561: All of Palm Beach County: West Palm Beach, Boca Raton, Boynton Beach, Delray Beach, Belle Glade.
 645: Future overlay code (2023) with 305 and 786 for Miami-Dade County and the Florida Keys
 656: Overlay with 813 for all of Hillsborough County, including Tampa, Plant City; inland areas of Pasco County, and parts of Oldsmar in Pinellas County
 689: Overlay with 407 and part of 321 for Orlando, Cocoa Beach, Kissimmee, St. Cloud and central eastern Florida
 727: Majority of Pinellas County including Clearwater, St. Petersburg, excluding parts of Oldsmar; coastal third of Pasco County
 728: Future area code (2023) for overlay with 561.
 754: Overlay with 954 for all of Broward County: Fort Lauderdale, Hollywood, Coral Springs
 772: Vero Beach, Port Saint Lucie, Fort Pierce, Sebastian, Stuart and central eastern Florida
 786: Overlay with 305 for Miami-Dade County and the Florida Keys
 813: Overlay with 656 for all of Hillsborough County, including Tampa, Plant City; inland areas of Pasco County, and parts of Oldsmar in Pinellas County, overlays with Area Code 656
 850: Overlay with 448 for Pensacola, Navarre, Tallahassee, Panama City and the Florida panhandle
 863: Lakeland, Arcadia, Avon Park, Clewiston, Bartow, Sebring, Winter Haven, Poinciana and south central Florida
 904: Jacksonville, St. Augustine, Starke, Green Cove Springs and northeastern Florida
 941: Gulf Coast immediately south of Tampa Bay: all of Manatee County. Sarasota County, and Charlotte County; includes Bradenton, Port Charlotte, Sarasota, Punta Gorda
 954: Overlay with 754 for all of Broward County: Fort Lauderdale, Hollywood, Coral Springs

References

External links

 
Florida
Area codes